George Elsworth Wiley (May 7, 1881 – March 3, 1954) was an American racing cyclist who competed in the early twentieth century.

He competed in Cycling at the 1904 Summer Olympics in Missouri and won the silver in the 5 miles and the bronze in the 25 miles race. In the 1/2 mile event he finished fourth and in the 1 mile competition he was eliminated in the first round.

References

External links
 
 
 

1881 births
1954 deaths
American male cyclists
Cyclists at the 1904 Summer Olympics
Olympic silver medalists for the United States in cycling
Olympic bronze medalists for the United States in cycling
Medalists at the 1904 Summer Olympics
UCI Track Cycling World Champions (men)
American track cyclists